Jason Lester Honigman (October 25, 1904 – September 12, 1990) was a lawyer and the Republican nominee for Michigan Attorney General in 1958.

Early life
Honigman was born in Russia on October 25, 1904. He emigrated to the United States in 1911 with his mother.  After arriving in the United States, he was reunited with his father who had emigrated at an earlier time.  In 1916, the Honigman family moved to Detroit, Michigan.

Law career 

In 1926, he graduated from the University of Michigan at the head of his class.  During college, he worked for a law firm headed by the Governor of Michigan, Alex Groesbeck.  In 1948, with Milton J. Miller, he formed a law firm that is known today as Honigman LLP (commonly “Honigman”), currently located in the First National Building in the heart of downtown Detroit directly facing Campus Martius Park.  In 1949, he authored Michigan Court Rules Annotated.

Politics 

Honigman was a member of the Republican party.  In 1958, he was the Republican nominee for Michigan Attorney General, losing to Democratic nominee Paul L. Adams of Sault Ste. Marie, Michigan.

Business 

He served as chairman and chief executive officer of a national supermarket chain, Allied Supermarkets, from 1960 to 1968 and remained chairman until 1975.  Honigman was also chairman of the Gold Bell Stamp Company.  He also served as president of the Michigan Mortgage Corporation.

Death 

He died at his home in Beverly Hills, Michigan of congestive heart failure.  He was 85 years old at the time of death.

References 

1904 births
1990 deaths
Michigan Republicans
Michigan lawyers
University of Michigan alumni
20th-century American lawyers
People from Beverly Hills, Michigan